

Gobabis Airport  is an airport serving the town of Gobabis, Namibia. Airport elevation . Runway 07/25 length: . Runway 11/29 length: . Both are gravel runways. Customs and Immigration on request.

See also
List of airports in Namibia
Transport in Namibia

References

External links
OurAirport - Gobabis
OpenStreetMap - Gobabis
SkyVector - Gobabis Airport

Airports in Namibia